Mirzo Ulugbek is one of 12 districts (tuman) of Tashkent, the capital of Uzbekistan. It was named after the astronomer, mathematician and sultan Ulugh Beg. The urban-type settlement Ulugbek is part of the district.

Overview
Mirzo Ulugbek is located in the northeastern part city. It was established in 1981 as Kuybyshev, after the Russian revolutionary leader Valerian Kuybyshev.

Mirzo Ulugbek borders the districts of Yunusabad and Yashnobod, and is adjacent to Tashkent Province.

References

External links

Districts of Tashkent
Populated places established in 1981
1981 establishments in the Soviet Union